Charles Noah Orr (June 7, 1877 – January 10, 1949) was a Minnesota politician and the first Majority Leader of the Minnesota Senate.

Orr worked as an attorney and in the office of the state auditor before being elected to office. He was first elected to the Minnesota House of Representatives in 1910, and was elected to the Senate in 1914. He served in the Senate for the rest of his life, becoming the first Majority Leader of the body in 1933, representing the Conservative Caucus in the then-nonpartisan body.

Orr died of a heart attack on the way to the capitol on January 10, 1949.

Orr was married to Ellen May Adams, who died on June 12, 1938. The couple had two daughters, Marian and Janet.

References

1877 births
Republican Party members of the Minnesota House of Representatives
Republican Party Minnesota state senators
1949 deaths
People from Princeton, Minnesota
Carleton College alumni
Hamline University alumni
William Mitchell College of Law alumni
Minnesota lawyers